Nightcrawler or nightcrawlers may refer to:

Earthworms
Nightcrawler, any large earthworm, especially those favored in angling
Lumbricus terrestris, a globally-distributed species of earthworm, known in North America as nightcrawler 
Eudrilus eugeniae, the African night crawler, native to tropical West Africa
European nightcrawler, Eisenia hortensis

Literature
"The Night Crawler", a 1959 short story by Charles G. Finney
Nightcrawler (comics), a Marvel Comics superhero
"The Case of the Night Crawler", a Sherlock Holmes short story by George Mann
Nightcrawling (novel), novel by Leila Mottley longlisted for 2022 Booker Prize

Film and television
Nightcrawler (film), a 2014 American film
"Nightcrawler", an episode of X-Men (TV series)
"Nightcrawlers" (The Twilight Zone), an episode of the 1980s TV series
"The Night Crawler", an episode of The Bold Ones: The New Doctors
"The Night Crawler", a 1950 episode of The Adventures of Frank Race

Music
Nightcrawlers (band), a Scottish dance music project 
The Nightcrawlers, a Daytona Florida band
New Orleans Nightcrawlers, a jazz and rhythm and blues group
Nghtcrwlrs, a New Jersey band

Albums
Nightcrawler (album), by Pete Yorn, 2006
Night Crawler (album), by Sonny Stitt with Don Patterson, 1965, and the title track
Nightcrawler, by The Retrosic, 2006

Songs
"Nightcrawler", a 2010 single by Nosaj Thing
Nightcrawler (Travis Scott song), from the 2015 album Rodeo
"Nightcrawler", a 2017 single by Zhu
"Nightcrawler", a 2018 single by InCrest
"Nightcrawler" by Rebelution from the 2007 album Courage to Grow
"Nightcrawler" by Aye Nako from the 2017 album Silver Haze
"Nightcrawler" by Czarface from the 2015 album Every Hero Needs a Villain
"Night Crawler", a 2012 single by Lucid featuring SwizZz
"Night Crawler", a 2017 single by Chris Webby
"Night Crawler", by Judas Priest from the 1990 album Painkiller
"Night Crawler", by Bob James from the 1976 album Heads
"Night Crawler", a cover by Powerwolf on the 2015 album Blessed & Possessed
"Night Crawler", by Starz from the 1976 album Starz
"Night Crawler", by Ezo from the 1989 album Fire Fire
"Night Crawler", by Lisa Maffia from the 2003 album First Lady
"Night Crawler", by Jimsaku from the 1993 album Wind Loves Us
"Night Crawler", by Thee Oh Sees from the 2013 album Floating Coffin

Other uses
Nightcrawlers, fictional characters in video game F.E.A.R. Perseus Mandate
Night Crawler, a game by Rabbit Software
The Night Crawler, nickname of Shoshone, a Chicago, Burlington and Quincy Railroad train
The Nightcrawler, a ring name of wrestler The Boogeyman
Yobai (Japanese, 'Night crawling'), an ancient Japanese custom of young unmarried men and women

See also

Diggs Nightcrawler, a video game for the PlayStation 3
Night photography